"I'm Here Saying Nothing" is a song by Hitomi Yaida, released as her third Japanese single. The song was taken from the album Candlize. It reached number four on the Japan Oricon charts. Meja covered this song later.

Track listing

Notes

2001 singles
Hitomi Yaida songs
2001 songs
Songs written by Hitomi Yaida